The men's 200 metres event at the 1959 Pan American Games was held at the Soldier Field in Chicago on 30 and 31 August.

Medalists

Results

Heats
Held on 30 August

Semifinals
Held on 30 August

Final
Held on 31 August

References

Athletics at the 1959 Pan American Games
1959